Zecharia Ratzabi (29 May 1934 – 10 October 2005) was an Israeli footballer. He played in eleven matches for the Israel national football team from 1958 to 1962.

References

External links
 

1934 births
2005 deaths
Israeli footballers
Israel international footballers
Place of birth missing
Association footballers not categorized by position